You're welcome is a phrase used to acknowledge an expression of gratitude.

You're Welcome may also refer to:

 You're Welcome (Wavves album), 2017, or the title track
 You're Welcome (A Day to Remember album), 2021
 You're Welcome! (Electric Six album), 2017
 You're Welcome, a 1978 album by BZN
 You're Welcome, a 2020 album by Blacklite District

 "You're Welcome" (Angel), 2004
 "You're Welcome" (song), a 1967 song by the Beach Boys
 "You're Welcome", a song by Dwayne Johnson or Jordan Fisher and Lin-Manuel Miranda from the soundtrack album to the film Moana, 2016

See also
 Dōitashimashite ("You're Welcome" in Japanese), a 2010 album by Omar Rodríguez-López